Survivor: The Philippines (Hisardut HaPhilipinim) is the third season of Israeli competitive reality television show  Survivor. It was filmed in March and April 2009 in the Philippines, and aired on Channel 10 from August 29 until December 30 of that year, when Shay Arel was named the winner over Tom Altagar and Leora Goldberg by a vote of 6–3–0, and Tal Englander was named the audience's favorite player by winning a public vote.

This season featured the most competitors to date, with 25. Seven of these contestants were eliminated from the main game in the first two days, and sent to another island to compete against each other for a chance to return. This was shown in a four-part companion series, Survivor: The Philippines – The Hidden Island (Hisardut HaPhilipinim — HaAi HaNaalam), which aired separately from the main series during the first four weeks of broadcast.

The game largely followed the format from the previous season, but hidden immunity idols and Exile Island duels were modified for this season only. Instead of hidden immunity idols being hidden at tribe camps or Exile Island, the winner of each post-merge duel received half an idol, which could only be used at the following two Tribal Councils; castaways could either try to win the subsequent duel for the other half, or combine halves with the castaway who won an adjacent duel. For the duels, the Exile Island component was removed, and the dueling castaways returned to their tribes immediately following the challenge.

This season also featured an appearance from Rupert Boneham, a contestant from the American version of Survivor, who appeared as part of a reward in a reward challenge.



The Hidden Island
This season introduced the Hidden Island, a secluded location where eliminated contestants competed against each other to return to the game. During the first two days, the 25 contestants competed in a series of challenges; one castaway was eliminated on Day 1 after losing two challenges, while six more were eliminated the following day after not being chosen for tribes. These seven castaways were sent to the Hidden Island, unbeknownst to the other castaways.

On the Hidden Island, the castaways competed in challenges; the first-place competitor won a reward and the power to nominate a castaway for banishment, while the last-place competitor automatically became the other nominee. The five non-nominated castaways then voted between the two nominees to permanently eliminate one from the game, at which point they were replaced with the latest castaway eliminated from the main game (the new arrivals were immune from nomination for one round, but were still eligible to compete in the challenge). After four rounds, the seven remaining Hidden Island residents competed for four spots to return to the game: one by being chosen by the other residents as the "best social player" and three by winning a two-stage challenge. The four returning contestants then became the captains for two new tribes, and the Hidden Island was retired.

The Hidden Island contestants were given an additional method of re-entry by way of a team challenge. The castaways sent four representatives to one of the tribe camps, where they were given ten minutes to find a special flag; doing so would result in all seven Hidden Island contestants returning to the game, with that tribe taking their place on the Hidden Island. The Hidden Island contestants lost this challenge.

Contestants

Season summary

Voting history

Hidden Island voting history

References

Philippine Islands
Channel 10 (Israeli TV channel) original programming
2009 Israeli television seasons
Reality television articles with incorrect naming style
Television shows filmed in the Philippines